Phyllocnistis breynilla is a moth of the family Gracillariidae, known from Guangdong, China.

The hostplant for the species is Breynia fruticosa, and the moths mine on the upper side of the plant's leaves.

References

Phyllocnistis
Endemic fauna of China